Worm Lake also known as Vermilac Lake is a  lake in Baraga County, Michigan. Both the Murphy River and the Vermilac River are inflows along the southern side of the lake. The Rock River is an out flow along the northeast side of the lake. Worm Lake is surrounded by dense forest and is largely undeveloped. There is one public boat launch on the north side of the lake.

See also 
 List of lakes in Michigan

References

Lakes of Michigan